The Industrial Commission was a United States government body in existence from 1898 to 1902. It was appointed by President William McKinley to investigate railroad pricing policy, industrial concentration, and the impact of immigration on labor markets, and make recommendations to the President and Congress. McKinley and the Commissioners launched the trust-busting era. The Industrial Commission included McKinley's Ohio running mate, Commissioner Andrew L. Harris (a Governor of Ohio and Civil War General) who served as Chair of the Agriculture Subcommittee, and prominent Senators and Congressmen. After McKinley was assassinated in 1901, President Theodore Roosevelt heeded the advice of the Commissioners and further regulated the large trusts. Roosevelt became known as the nation's toughest trust-buster.

See also
 Commission on Industrial Relations, also known as the Walsh Commission, a commission created by the U.S. Congress on August 23, 1912. The commission studied work conditions throughout the industrial United States between 1913 and 1915.

Defunct agencies of the United States government
Competition regulators
Presidency of William McKinley
Progressive Era in the United States
United States national commissions
Consumer organizations in the United States